West Virginia Route 98 is an east–west state highway located in the Clarksburg, West Virginia area. The western terminus of the route is at U.S. Route 50 west of Clarksburg. The eastern terminus is at West Virginia Route 20 in Nutter Fort, immediately south of Clarksburg.

Major intersections

References

098
Clarksburg, West Virginia
Transportation in Harrison County, West Virginia